The Indian jungle crow (Corvus culminatus) is a species of crow found across the Indian Subcontinent south of the Himalayas. It is very common and readily distinguished from the house crow (Corvus splendens), which has a grey neck. In the past the species was treated as a subspecies of another crow species, but vocalizations and evidence from ectoparasite co-evolution and phylogenetic evidence have led to it being considered as a distinct species in modern taxonomic treatments. It differs in its voice from the large-billed crow (Corvus macrorhynchos) found in the higher elevations of the Himalayas and the eastern jungle crow (Corvus levaillantii) overlaps in the eastern part of its range. In appearance, it can be difficult to distinguish from either of these species although the plumage tends to be more uniformly glossed in purple and has a longer bill with a fine tip and a less arched culmen. The Himalayan species has a slightly wedge-shaped tail, unlike the rounded tail of the Indian jungle crow and tends to glide a lot .

Description

This glossy all-black crow has a heavy black bill but without an arching culmen (upper edge of the mandible) and has a fine tip. The feathers have a purple gloss throughout. The tail of the Indian jungle crow is rounded and the legs and feet are stout. The base of the nape feathers is dusky. The Himalayan japonensis (in this sense including western intermedius and eastern tibetosinensis) has a slightly wedge-shaped tail and a voice is a guttural and grating graak (intermedius) or a hoarse kyarrh (tibetosinensis). The calls of the Indian jungle crow are not unlike that of the house crow, but are harsher. In Sri Lanka, the house crow lacks the light grey neck, but the neck is slimmer than in the jungle crow. The sexes are indistinguishable.

Taxonomy

The classification of the Asian crows has been in a state of confusion. This species was described as Corvus culminatus by Colonel W. H Sykes based on a specimen from Pune. Eugene Oates lumped this with Corvus macrorhynchos in  The Fauna of British India, Including Ceylon and Burma (1889), based on what had been concluded by Allan Octavian Hume based on the inability to see consistent differences in the specimens. W. E. Brooks had pointed out that the voice of the Himalayan species differed significantly apart from having a longer tail. The second edition of The Fauna of British India. (1922) by Stuart Baker considered macrorhynchos as a form restricted to Java and considered the Indian forms to be made up of three subspecies of the Australian raven (Corvus coronoides). Ernst Hartert looked at the colour of the base of the neck feather and grouped those that had grey bases into one group (coronoides ravens) and those that had white bases into the crow (southern) group and the northern forms, including the Indian ones, into levaillantii, with nine subspecies. Ernst Mayr reshuffled the group in 1940. Hugh Whistler and Norman Boyd Kinnear decided that the three Indian forms culminatus, intermedius and macrorhynchos were subspecies of Corvus macrorhynchos. Charles Vaurie made another revision in 1954. Salim Ali and Dillon Ripley in the Handbook of the Birds of India and Pakistan used macrorhynchos, under which they placed four forms: culminatus, intermedius, levaillantii and tibetosinensis. 

Ectoparasitic bird lice in the genus Myrsidea coevolve with their hosts and a study of speciation within the genus suggested distinct groups with well-marked distributions. Comparisons of the vocalizations of birds from different areas also indicated clear differences and analysis of sequence divergence in the mitochondrial DNA suggests that the Himalayan population (termed as japonensis by some or as intermedius+tibetosinensis by those who restrict the range of japonensis to Japan) differentiated from the plains-dwelling culminatus nearly 2 million years ago.

Distribution

The Indian jungle crow is found across mainland India south of the foothills of the Himalayas, east of the desert regions of northwestern India and having an eastern limit around Bengal. It is also found in Sri Lanka.

Behaviour and ecology
The Indian jungle crow is resident throughout its range. It is usually seen singly, in pairs or small groups. It is an opportunist and generalist omnivore.  It may soften its food by dropping it in water, and have also been observed to eat sand after feeding on meat from a carcass. They have a range of cawing vocalizations. It sometimes flies with special flight styles, hoarse calls in flight or when perched with a puffed throat and accompanied by bowing movements of the head and tail dipping. The behavioural significance of these calls and postures is unknown.

The breeding season is mainly March–April in northern India and earlier in southern India. In Sri Lanka, it is from May–July. The nest is a platform of twigs placed in a large tree and very rarely on buildings. The centre of the nest is neatly lined with hair, coir or other fine fibres. The usual clutch is three to five pale blue-green eggs speckled with brown. The eggs hatch after about 17–19 days and the young fledge in about a month. The nests are sometimes parasitized by the Asian koel, although not as frequently as the house crow.

References

External links
Indian jungle crow sounds on xeno-canto.

Corvus
Birds described in 1832
Taxa named by William Henry Sykes